The Constitution of the Republic of the Union of Myanmar is the supreme law of Myanmar. Myanmar's first constitution adopted by constituent assembly was enacted for the Union of Burma in 1947. After the 1962 Burmese coup d'état, a second constitution was enacted in 1974. The country has been ruled by military juntas for most of its history.

The 2008 Constitution, the country's third constitution, was published in September 2008 after a referendum, and came into force on 31 January 2011. 

The Tatmadaw (Myanmar Armed Forces) retain significant control of the government under the 2008 constitution. 25% of seats in the Parliament of Myanmar are reserved for serving military officers. The ministries of home, border affairs and defense have to be headed by a serving military officer. The military also appoints one of the country's two vice presidents. Hence, the country's civilian leaders have little influence over the security establishment.

History
Before independence, Myanmar had two quasi-constitutions, The government of Burma Act, 1935 and Constitution of Burma under Japanese occupation, 1943. After independence, Myanmar adopted three constitutions in 1947, 1974 and 2008. The 2008 constitution is the present constitution of Myanmar.

1947 Constitution
The 1947 constitution, officially the Constitution of the Union of Burma, was drafted and approved by the Constituent Assembly of Burma in 1947, and was used from the country's independence in 1948 to 1962, when the constitution was suspended by the socialist Revolutionary Council of the Union of Burma, led by military general Ne Win. The national government consisted of three branches: judicial, legislative and executive. The legislative branch was a bicameral legislature called the Union Parliament, consisting of two chambers, the 125-seat Chamber of Nationalities ( Lumyozu Hluttaw) and the Chamber of Deputies ( Pyithu Hluttaw), whose seat numbers were determined by the population size of respective constituencies. The 1947 constitution was largely based on the 1946 Yugoslav Constitution, as several Burmese officials visited Yugoslavia earlier that year.

1962
The 1947 Constitution was suspended upon the occurrence of the 1962 military coup.

1974 Constitution
The 1974 constitution, officially the Constitution of the Socialist Republic of the Union of Burma, was the second constitution to be written, was approved in a 1973 referendum, and was adopted on 3 January 1974.

It created a unicameral legislature called the People's Assembly (Pyithu Hluttaw), represented by members of the Burma Socialist Programme Party. Each term was 4 years. Ne Win became the president at this time.

1988–2008
Upon taking power in September 1988, the military based State Law and Order Restoration Council (SLORC) suspended the 1974 constitution. The SLORC called a constitutional convention in 1993, but it was suspended in 1996 when the National League for Democracy (NLD) boycotted it, calling it undemocratic. The constitutional convention was again called in 2004, but without the NLD. Myanmar remained without a constitution until 2008.

2008 Constitution

On 9 April 2008, the military government of Myanmar (Burma) released its proposed constitution for the country to be put to a vote in public referendum on 10 May 2008, as part of its roadmap to democracy. The constitution is hailed by the military as heralding a return to democracy, but the opposition sees it as a tool for continuing military control of the country.

The legislative branch is the Assembly of the Union Pyidaungsu Hluttaw, which is a bicameral legislature consisting of the 440-seat House of Representatives and the 224-seat House of Nationalities. Military (Tatmadaw) member delegates are reserved a maximum of 56 of 224 seats in the National Assembly and 110 seats of 440 in the People's Assembly. This is similar to former Indonesian and Thai constitution.

The revisions in state structure, including the creation of self-administering areas were not implemented until August 2010. The constitution itself came into force on 31 January 2011.

At the time of its release, foreign media often incorrectly alleged that the constitution barred Aung San Suu Kyi from holding public office because of her marriage to a British citizen; in fact, she would only be barred from the office of President, under the disqualification of those who have a spouse or children who are foreign citizens. There is no similar disqualification for any other public office.

2008 constitutional referendum

On 10 May 2008 a referendum was held to outline the political framework of the country. According to Chief Justice Aung Toe, who is chairman of the drafting commission, 

The government did not allow Cyclone Nargis to delay the referendum which took place as scheduled except in the delta areas affected by the cyclone.

The National League for Democracy, which is led by Aung San Suu Kyi, was not allowed to participate in the creation of the constitution, and urged citizens to reject the constitution which it labelled as a "sham."  The referendum itself passed the 2008 Constitution, but was generally regarded as fraudulent by the opposition party and those outside of Burma.

2012 by-elections
In spite of its earlier opposition to the 2008 constitution, the NLD participated in the 2012 by-election for 46 seats and won a landslide victory, with Aung San Suu Kyi becoming a member of parliament, alongside 42 others from her party.

Amending process
The ruling party and opposition parties have acknowledged that amendments are needed. The 2008 constitution reserves 25% of seats in parliament for members of the military, with the most powerful posts given to active-duty or retired generals.

Content of Constitution
The Myanmar Constitution has 15 chapters. Chapters 4, 5, and 6 concern the separation of powers between the legislature, judiciary, and executive. Due to over 50 years of military rule, the Constitution of Myanmar is dominated by the military, with 25% of the seats in both houses of the Assembly of the Union (Pyidaungsu Hluttaw) reserved for military representatives. Proposed changes to most parts of the constitution must be approved by more than 75% of both houses of the Assembly of the Union. For some others it must do so then go to a referendum. When the referendum is held, the changes must be approved by at least 50% of the registered voters, rather than 50% of those voting. A 194-page booklet containing the text in Burmese and English is available to download.

Type of content
  Preamble 
 Basic Principles of the Union 
 State Structure 
 Head of State 
 Legislature 
 Executive 
 Judiciary 
 Defence Services 
 Citizen, Fundamental Rights and Duties of the Citizens 
 Election 
 Political Parties 
 Provisions on State of Emergency 
 Amendment of the Constitution 
 State Flag, State Seal, National Anthem and the Capital 
 Transitory Provisions 
 General Provisions

References

External links
 "Booklet of 194 pages (in Burmese & English Language) " 
 "1947 Constitution of Burma (Web Archive)"
 "1947 Constitution of the Union of Burma (Burma Library)"
 The 1974 Constitution of the Socialist Republic of the Union of Burma (Burma Library) 
 "1974 Constitution of Burma"
 "Constitution of the Republic of the Union of Myanmar (2008)" Official English version
 Aung Htoo A Brief Analysis on the Constitution of Burma (2008) // FIDH/BLC Seminar Advancing Human Rights and ending impunity in Burma: which external leverages? Paris: Imprimerie de la FIDH, 2010 – pp. 53–58

1974 in law
2008 in law
Law of Myanmar
Myanmar